Hadzhi Dimitar is a village in Kavarna Municipality, Dobrich Province, northeastern Bulgaria.

Hadzhi Dimitar Peak on Graham Land, Antarctica is named after the village.

References

Villages in Dobrich Province